Minuscule 131 (in the Gregory-Aland numbering), δ 467 (Soden), is a Greek minuscule manuscript of the New Testament, on parchment leaves. Palaeographically it has been assigned to the 15th-century. It has marginalia.

Description 

The codex contains the text of the New Testament except the Book of Revelation on 233 parchment leaves (size ). The text is written in two columns per page, 37 lines per page.

The text of the Gospels is divided according to the Ammonian Sections (in Mark 234 sections – the last numbered section in 16:9), but there is no references to the Eusebian Canons.

Lectionary markings and incipits were added by a later hand.

It contains many errors of iotacism and many remarkable variations.

The order of books is usual for Greek manuscripts: Gospels, Acts, Catholic epistles, and Pauline epistles. The Epistle to the Hebrews stands before 1 Timothy.

Text 

The Greek text of the codex is a representative of the Caesarean text-type in the Gospels. It belongs to the textual family f1. This was confirmed by the Claremont Profile Method.

Kurt Aland placed it in Category III.

The manuscript contains many corrections made by prima manu.

In 1 Corinthians 2:4 it has singular reading πειθοις ανθρωπινης σοφιας και λογοις for πειθοις σοφιας λογοις (plausible words of wisdom).

John 5:1 it reads η σκηνοπηγια for εορτη των Ιουδαιων; the reading is not supported by any known Greek manuscript, or version.

History 

Birch dated the manuscript to the 11th-century, Gregory to the 14th or 15th-century. The INTF dated it to the 15th-century.

The manuscript was given to Pope Sixtus V (1585–1590). It was examined by Birch (about 1782) and Scholz. According to Scholz it has the Book of Revelation and he assigned to it the siglum 66r. Gregory saw it in 1886.

It is currently housed at the Vatican Library (Vat. gr. 360), at Rome.

See also 
 List of New Testament minuscules
 Family 1
 Biblical manuscript
 Textual criticism

References

Further reading 

 K. Lake, Codex 1 of the Gospels and its Allies, Texts and Studies VII 3 (Cambridge, 1902).

Greek New Testament minuscules
Manuscripts of the Vatican Library
15th-century biblical manuscripts